Simon Davies (born 7 May 1957) is a Welsh television presenter actor and writer, hailing from Cardiff, South Wales. He is married to Laura Jeffery. He presented the BBC television programme Tikkabilla, has been on Corners (1989) television series as himself, and narrated the second series of Our Planet shown on CBeebies in 2006.

Before that he presented Play School and was a bus driver in the series Playdays. He also did the KS2 National Tests Revise Wise.

Davies played The Sheriff of Nottingham in the Christmas 2007 (7 December 2007 – 6 January 2008) pantomime 'Robin Hood' at the Connaught Theatre in Worthing, West Sussex. He can sometimes be seen presenting on Speedauction TV.

Davies also wrote for a bunch of shows on BBC, ITV, Channel 4 and Channel 5, His notable credits includes Fimbles, Playdays, Monster Cafe, Melvin and Maureen's Music a Grams, Words and Pictures, Tikkabilla, Bob the Builder etc.

References

External links

Welsh television presenters
Living people
Mass media people from Cardiff
Place of birth missing (living people)
1957 births